SELFOC Microlenses are flat-ended gradient-index lenses. The refractive index variation in the material is created by ion exchange. They are used as collimators or lenses for filter components.  The flat ends make alignment easy. They were developed by Nippon Sheet Glass.

References 

 SELFOC Microlens Technical Charts
 SELFOC Lens Calculations - Distance
 SELFOC Mircolens Calculations - Magnification
 SELFOC Microlens Arrays for 1:1 Image transfer

External links 
 GO FOTON!

Lenses